Laura San Giacomo (born November 14, 1961 or 1962) is an American actress. She played Cynthia in the film Sex, Lies, and Videotape (1989) for which she won the Independent Spirit Award for Best Supporting Female, Kit De Luca in the film Pretty Woman (1990), Crazy Cora in the film Quigley Down Under (1990), Nadine Cross in The Stand (1994), and Maya Gallo on the NBC sitcom Just Shoot Me! (1997–2003). A BAFTA and two-time Golden Globe Award nominee, she also played the regular role of Rhetta Rodriguez on the TNT drama Saving Grace (2007–2010), and the recurring role of Dr. Grace Confalone on the CBS drama NCIS (2016–2019, 2022).

Early life and education
San Giacomo, an Italian American, was born in West Orange, New Jersey, the daughter of MaryJo and John San Giacomo, a paper mill owner. She grew up in Denville, New Jersey. San Giacomo discovered acting while attending Morris Knolls High School. In 1984, she received a fine arts degree, specializing in acting, from Carnegie Mellon School of Drama in Pittsburgh.

Career
After graduating, she moved to New York. San Giacomo then went on to appear in several theater productions, including the Garry Marshall-Lowell Ganz production of Wrong Turn at Lungfish in Los Angeles, the Princeton/McCarter Theatre production of Three Sisters, and off-Broadway in Beirut. She also starred in Italian American Reconciliation, regional productions of Shakespeare's The Tempest, As You Like It and Romeo and Juliet, as well as Crimes of the Heart. In a review of the Walnut Street Theatre 1986 presentation of As You Like It, San Giacomo received a special mention: "although doll-like Laura San Giacomo had only a minor role as a wilful shepherdess, she sank her fangs into it and received the only show-interrupting applause of the evening."

Early career
San Giacomo's first television appearances were four episodes on three television series during 1987.  Two notable appearances were in Crime Story in 1988 for the episode "Protected Witness" (Season 2 / Episode 13) as Theresa Farantino, and in Miami Vice in 1989 for the episode, "Leap of Faith" (Season 5, Episode 21) as Tania Lewis. The Miami Vice episode also featured a guest appearance by her future husband, actor Cameron Dye, one year before their marriage. Prior to that, she was featured on the daytime soap opera All My Children as Louisa Sanchez, the Latina common-law wife of Mitch Beck (Brian Fitzpatrick) whose presence threatened to thwart his relationship with Hillary Martin (Carmen Thomas).

However, San Giacomo first drew international attention in Steven Soderbergh's Sex, Lies, and Videotape (1989), which also marked her film debut as a credited actor (in the 1988 movie Miles from Home, her role as "Sandy" was not credited). Her work in the film was nominated for a Golden Globe Award, and she received a Los Angeles Film Critics Association New Generation Award. The film was honored with the Cannes Film Festival's prestigious Grand Prize, the Palme d'Or.

In 1990, San Giacomo played a supporting role as Julia Roberts's character's wisecracking roommate Kit De Luca in Pretty Woman. The blockbuster film ended up generating $178 million at the box office.

San Giacomo has appeared in such films as Quigley Down Under (1990), Vital Signs (1990), Under Suspicion (1991), Once Around (1991), Where the Day Takes You (1992), Nina Takes a Lover (1994), and Suicide Kings (1997). She also appeared as Nadine Cross in the Stephen King TV miniseries The Stand opposite Rob Lowe, which landed them on the cover of the May 7–13, 1994, issue of TV Guide. She continued doing films, and as 1999 ended, she did the film Eat Your Heart Out. In 2001, San Giacomo landed the starring role in the Jenifer Estess bio-pic Jenifer, which aired on CBS in October of that year.

San Giacomo did voice work for the animated series Gargoyles (as the character of Fox). However, she went uncredited for the role because her agent believed it would damage her reputation to have worked on an animated series.

Just Shoot Me!

Needing to work, but not wanting to be away from her newborn son for months at a time, San Giacomo shifted to television in the role of hot-tempered, sassy journalist Maya Gallo in the situation comedy Just Shoot Me! (1997–2003). Her character was partially based on an unproduced idea that executive producer Steven Levitan once had in mind for actress Janeane Garofalo when he was a writer for The Larry Sanders Show. San Giacomo was originally cast in the starring role, since the series was meant to center on her character; however, the show soon adopted an ensemble style. Despite the shift in focus, San Giacomo remained an integral part of the show and with top billing. She and the four other main cast members appeared in all 148 episodes of the series, which lasted until 2003.

San Giacomo's work during Season 2 (1997–1998) earned her a Golden Globe Award nomination in 1998 for Best Actress in a Television Comedy or Musical; the award went to Dharma & Greg's Jenna Elfman.

Post-Just Shoot Me! and appearances
After NBC cancelled Just Shoot Me! in 2003, San Giacomo appeared sporadically on television and in films. She made guest appearances on several television series, including the short-lived CBS crime drama The Handler in 2003 and HBO's Unscripted in 2005. She was the narrator for the true crime series Snapped: Killer Couples on Oxygen. San Giacomo also appeared in the 2005 films Checking Out and Havoc, as well as the 2006 film Conquistadora. San Giacomo was to have made her return to television on The WB's new drama Related in 2005, but the character was recast due to creative differences. Kiele Sanchez took her place as "Anne Sorelli" on the show. San Giacomo also made few public appearances; she made her first public appearance in nearly a year on 19 October 2005 at the 15th Annual Environmental Media Awards.  She made two more public appearances at the Crystal and Lucy Awards on 6 June 2006 and at the 3rd Annual Alfred Mann Foundation Innovation and Inspiration Gala on 9 September 2006.

In 2006, San Giacomo returned to network television with three guest appearances on the third season of Veronica Mars. She reunited with her former love interest from Just Shoot Me!, Enrico Colantoni, playing Harmony Chase. Both Colantoni and San Giacomo enjoyed their reunion so much that they lobbied for their characters to appear together in further episodes.

In September 2006, San Giacomo secured her first starring role on a television program after Just Shoot Me!, when she reunited with a former peer and co-starred opposite fellow Carnegie-Mellon alum Holly Hunter in TNT's drama series Saving Grace. San Giacomo played Grace's best friend Rhetta Rodriguez.

In June 2010, San Giacomo guest starred in the episode titled "Death Becomes Her" on the USA network's In Plain Sight. She played a woman from an organized crime family with a terminal illness. In December 2011, San Giacomo appeared on the episode titled "Beards" on Hot in Cleveland, as Caroline, Melanie's estranged sister.

Personal life 
San Giacomo has been married twice. Her first marriage (1990–1998) was to actor Cameron Dye, with whom she had a son, Mason Dye, who has cerebral palsy. In 2000 she remarried, to actor Matt Adler. San Giacomo is a cousin of Torry Castellano, former drummer of the rock group The Donnas.

She lives in the San Fernando Valley, California. Her hobbies include horseback riding, gymnastics, ice skating, ballet, tennis, golf and playing piano.

Philanthropy
San Giacomo has been honored by the American Academy for Cerebral Palsy and Developmental Medicine, by Media Access for a TV public service announcement (PSA) on "Inclusive Education" (in The More You Know TV PSA series), by Shane's Inspiration with their Humanitarian Award, and Redbook's Mother and Shaker Award.  She has been a keynote speaker at various conferences for TASH and CalTASH, which promote an inclusive society, and at two conferences sponsored by the U.S. Department of Education, and at the Young Neuroscientists' Workshop for the Children's Neurobiological Solutions Foundation (now the Pediatric Brain Foundation).

In 2021, she was listed as the Board Secretary of the international wheelchair-charity Momentum Wheels for Humanity, and Honorary Chair of the Environment of People Foundation, Inc., a charity promoting music opportunities for children.

Filmography

Film

Television

References

External links 

 
 
 

1962 births
Living people
20th-century American actresses
21st-century American actresses
Actresses from New Jersey
American film actresses
American people of Italian descent
American television actresses
American voice actresses
Carnegie Mellon University College of Fine Arts alumni
Independent Spirit Award for Best Supporting Female winners
People from Denville, New Jersey
People from West Orange, New Jersey
Washington College alumni